Alexander Tsesis is an American constitutional scholar who holds the Raymond & Mary Simon Chair in Constitutional Law at Loyola University.

Works

References

Loyola University Chicago School of Law faculty
Living people
American legal scholars
Scholars of constitutional law
Year of birth missing (living people)